In a speed typing contest contestants compete to attain the highest accurate typing speeds. These contests have been common in North America since the 1930s and were used to test the relative efficiency of typing with the Dvorak and QWERTY keyboard layouts.

Touchscreen keyboards

As of 2015, there were diverse claims regarding the fastest typing in smartphones and other touchscreen devices with on-screen keyboards. The typical yardstick is writing, with no mistakes, the 160-character text:

The razor-toothed piranhas of the genera Serrasalmus and Pygocentrus are the most ferocious freshwater fish in the world. In reality they seldom attack a human.

A disputed issue is whether auto-correct and predictive features should be allowed. Common sense indicates that they shouldn't, because when typing the record phrase several times the phone learns the text. Speed depends, then, on the phrase being repeated, a poor indicator of performance for everyday use. In the extreme, the phone could learn to predict "Serrasalmus" when typing just "Ser", but that would be extremely uncomfortable in normal circumstances ("ser" is the Spanish word for "being"). In fact, Guinness World Records establishes that "To qualify for the record, no autocorrect or predictive text features are allowed to remain on".

In March 2010, Samsung posted a 35.54-second record with predictive texting, but no actual footage. Later that year, Swype, a predictive keyboard for Android and iOS where users swipe their fingers across the keyboard to enter one word per stroke, claimed a record of 25.94 seconds, but with prediction features on. A YouTube user later claimed to have set a 21.8-second record on an iPhone, but the posted video clearly showed autocorrect enabled and correcting at least four mistakes.

In April 2014, in the midst of a publicity campaign for Windows Phone 8.1, Microsoft Research published a new record of 18.44 seconds, also with predictive features on. This record, obviously dependent on pre-learning by the keyboard's memory, became the object of mockery on the web. It was broken the next month when a time of 18.19 seconds was alleged by Brazilian youngster Marcel Fernandes Filho using the Fleksy mobile keyboard on an Android phone. While the firm claimed it was without autocorrection, video footage clearly contradicted this (e.g., the letter "B" was pressed when writing "genera"); furthermore, only a portion of the complete taping was displayed. This alleged record was admitted by Guinness in spite of violating its own rules of having the autocorrect feature off. Also, a dash (crucial for the record) appeared in the main keyboard, which was never a part of Fleksy's main screen. Thus, questions arose as to whether Guinness had been object of a misinformation scheme or even a party in it. In November 2014, Fleksy claimed Mr Fernandes Filho had broken his own record on a larger phone, but later removed the video.

In 2015, TipType, a What-You-Type-Is-What-You-Get keyboard with a QWERTY layout but based on sliding movements rather than pressing (similar to Swype), launched a speed contest for phones of traditional size. The company posted a 25-second record with a Samsung Galaxy S3 mini on YouTube and promised USD 500 to anyone bettering that record on a touchscreen of size 4.5" or less, subject to Guinness World Records rules.

By country

Malaysia
Malaysia began holding an annual contest in 2011. Each participant must pass a certain words per minute (WPM) to be eligible for the final live competition. The contest was jointly organized by team a students, JCI Mines and AYFIC Project. It receives support from Microsoft Malaysia, Malaysian Book of Records (MBR), Multimedia Development Corporation (MDeC), Multimedia IT Society, HYJ Wushu Academy and Blogmakeover, as well as various government agencies. The contest soft launched on 1 July 2011, including a press conference that received Chinese newspaper coverage.

The initial stage is open to all regardless of age. The 200 fastest entrants enter the final stage. Given a 5-minute time slot, participants can have unlimited 1-minute time trials keeping their best result.

The winner of the 2011 tournament was Shaun Low Foo Shern, with a speed of 146 words per minute.

In films
The 2012 French romantic comedy-drama film Populaire shows the relationship between a speed typist and her trainer.

See also
 Ultimate Typing Championship

References

Language competitions
Typing